St. Francis Xavier Catholic School is a private, Roman Catholic school in Junction City, Kansas, United States.  It is located in the Roman Catholic Diocese of Salina.

History
St. Xavier Catholic School was established in 1871 to serve parishioners of St. Xavier Church.

References

External links
 School Website

Catholic secondary schools in Kansas
Schools in Geary County, Kansas
Educational institutions established in 1871
1871 establishments in Kansas
Roman Catholic Diocese of Salina